Elvio Porcel de Peralta (born in Buenos Aires, Argentina) is a former Argentine naturalized Chilean footballer who played for Clubs of Chile.

Teams
  Rangers 1960-1967
  Santiago Wanderers 1968-1969

References
 

Living people
Argentine footballers
Argentine expatriate footballers
Santiago Wanderers footballers
Rangers de Talca footballers
Chilean Primera División players
Expatriate footballers in Chile
Association football midfielders
Year of birth missing (living people)
Naturalized citizens of Chile
Footballers from Buenos Aires